Jacques-Désiré is a given name, and may refer to:

 Jacques-Désiré Laval (1803-1864), French Roman Catholic priest
 Jacques-Désiré Périatambée (born 1975), Mauritian footballer

Compound given names
French masculine given names